David Taymurazovich Tsorayev (born 7 May 1983) is a former Ossetian professional footballer of Russian citizenship. 

He made his professional debut in the Russian Second Division in 2000 for FC Avtodor Vladikavkaz.

References

1983 births
Sportspeople from Vladikavkaz
Living people
Russian footballers
Association football midfielders
FC KAMAZ Naberezhnye Chelny players
FC Anzhi Makhachkala players
Russian Premier League players
FC Kuban Krasnodar players
FC Spartak Vladikavkaz players
FC SKA-Khabarovsk players